Hannah Gross (born ) is a Canadian actress. She is best known for her role as Debbie Mitford in the Netflix drama Mindhunter.

Early life 
Gross grew up in Toronto. She is the daughter of actors Martha Burns and Paul Gross. She attended New York University's Tisch School of the Arts and graduated with a Bachelor of Fine Arts in Theatre, minoring in Religious Studies.

Career
In 2010, Gross played Katie in Sharon Pollock's 1984 play Doc and directed Tennessee Williams' A Streetcar Named Desire (1947) for the Stella Adler Studio of Acting. She performed in Williams' 1953 one-act play Talk to Me Like the Rain and Let Me Listen in 2012. Gross was cast in I Used to Be Darker (2013) after meeting its director, Matthew Porterfield, at the after show party for the New York City screening of his previous film, Putty Hill (2010). Also in 2013, she played the title character in Dustin Guy Defa's short film Lydia Hoffman Lydia Hoffman. Gross played the lead female character in Charles Poekel's film Christmas, Again, which had its premiere at the 2014 Locarno International Film Festival. She also performed in Nathan Silver's 2014 film Uncertain Terms, and reunited with him in his 2015 film, Stinking Heaven. Also in 2014, Gross played the lead role in David Raboy's short film Beach Week.

In 2017, Gross starred in the Netflix drama Mindhunter, in which she played the role of Debbie Mitford, a post-graduate student at the University of Virginia and the girlfriend of one of the three leads.

Filmography

Film

Television

Stage

References

External links 
 

21st-century Canadian actresses
Actresses from Toronto
Canadian film actresses
Canadian stage actresses
Living people
Tisch School of the Arts alumni
Canadian expatriate actresses in the United States
Canadian television actresses
Year of birth missing (living people)